Sheila Gaff (December 29, 1989) is a German mixed martial artist, and was fighting in the bantamweight division of the Ultimate Fighting Championship but was released on August 12, 2013. Since May 14, 2015 she has been under contract with XFC. She is known for her berserker fighting style, which has resulted in most of her wins and losses coming via (T)KO stoppage within the first two minutes. Gaff has also worked a lot on her ground fighting, which led to successful participations in grappling tournaments. She is also known for being the first-ever woman released by UFC.

Mixed martial arts career

Gaff made her mixed martial arts debut on September 2, 2006. She won six of her first eight fights over the next three years.

On March 27, 2010, Gaff competed in a one-night tournament at Upcoming Glory 7. She defeated Lena Buytendijk in the first round and lost to Romy Ruyssen later in the night.

Gaff faced Cindy Dandois two months later at M-1 Selection 2010: Western Europe Round 3. She was disqualified after landing an illegal knee early in the third round.

On February 26, 2011, Gaff dropped down to 125 pounds to face Hanna Sillen at The Zone FC 8: Inferno. She defeated Sillen by knockout in eight seconds.

Cage Warriors
Gaff made her Cage Warriors debut when she fought Ireland's Aisling Daly at Cage Warriors Fighting Championship 41 on April 24, 2011 in Kentish Town, London. She defeated Daly by TKO in the first round.

Gaff was then scheduled to face Angela Hayes at Cage Warriors: Fight Night 2, but had to pull out due to illness and was replaced by Aisling Daly.

Gaff next fought Jennifer Maia at Cage Warriors: Fight Night 4 as part of a four-woman flyweight tournament to crown the inaugural Cage Warriors women's flyweight champion. She defeated Maia via knockout in ten seconds. Gaff began the fight with a sucker punch instead of touching gloves.

Gaff was scheduled to face Rosi Sexton in the tournament final at Cage Warriors Fighting Championship 49 on October 27, 2012 in Cardiff, Wales. Voluntary Anti-Doping Association (VADA) drug testing was used in the weeks prior to the planned fight. However, the bout was cancelled on October 19 when Gaff withdrew due to illness.

Ultimate Fighting Championship
On March 1, 2013, German website groundandpound.de reported that Gaff had signed a 4-fight contract with the UFC to join the UFC women's bantamweight division. She faced Sara McMann at UFC 159 on April 27. Gaff lost the fight via TKO in the first round.

In her second fight with the promotion, Gaff faced Amanda Nunes at UFC 163 on August 3, 2013. She lost the fight via TKO in the first round.
On August 12, 2013 German MMA magazine GroundandPound reported her release from the UFC. She was also the first-ever woman released by UFC.

XFC
On April 14, 2015 Gaff signed a 6-fight contract with XFC. She joins the Strawweight division of the organisation. Gaff debuted at XFCi 11 in Sao Paulo, Brazil on September 19, 2015 against Antonia Silvaneide. She won the fight via submission in Round 1.

KSW 

After XFC closing operations for undetermined time, Gaff signed a 1-fight contract with Polish organization KSW. She faced Brazilian prospect Ariane Lipski at her debut at KSW 36. She lost via knockout in the first round.

Mixed martial arts record

|-
| Win
| align=center| 10–7
| Milena Bojić
| TKO (punches)
| Dynasty Fighting Championship
| 
| align=center| 1
| align=center| 0:07
| Frankfurt, Germany
|  
|-
| Loss
| align=center| 9–7
| Ariane Lipski 
| KO (punches)
| KSW 36
| 
| align=center| 1
| align=center| 2:09
| Lubusz Voivodeship, Poland
|
|-
| Win
| align=center| 9–6
| Antonia Silvaneide
| Submission (armbar)
| XFCi 11
| 
| align=center| 1
| align=center| 4:46
| São Paulo, Brazil
| 
|-
| Loss
| align=center| 8–6
| Amanda Nunes
| TKO (punches and elbows)
| UFC 163
| 
| align=center| 1
| align=center| 2:08
| Rio de Janeiro, Brazil
| 
|-
| Loss
| align=center| 8–5
| Sara McMann
| TKO (punches)
| UFC 159
| 
| align=center| 1
| align=center| 4:06
| Newark, New Jersey, United States
| 
|-
| Win
| align=center| 8–4
| Jennifer Maia
| KO (punches)
| Cage Warriors Fight Night 4
| 
| align=center| 1
| align=center| 0:10
| Dubai, United Arab Emirates
| 
|-
| Win
| align=center| 7–4
| Aisling Daly
| TKO (knees and punches)
| Cage Warriors 41
| 
| align=center| 1
| align=center| 1:34
| Kentish Town, North London, England
| 
|-
| Win
| align=center| 6–4
| Hanna Sillen
| KO (punches)
| The Zone FC 8: Inferno
| 
| align=center| 1
| align=center| 0:08
| Gothenburg, Sweden
| 
|-
| Loss
| align=center| 5–4
| Milana Dudieva
| Decision (unanimous)
| ProFC 22
| 
| align=center| 3
| align=center| 5:00
| Rostov-on-Don, Russia
| 
|-
| Loss
| align=center| 5–3
| Cindy Dandois
| DQ (illegal knee to the head)
| M-1 Selection 2010: Western Europe Round 3
| 
| align=center| 3
| align=center| 0:10
| Helsinki, Finland
| 
|-
| Loss
| align=center| 5–2
| Romy Ruyssen
| Submission (armbar)
| Upcoming Glory 7
| 
| align=center| 1
| align=center| 1:08
| Overijssel, Netherlands
| 
|-
| Win
| align=center| 5–1
| Lena Buytendijk
| Submission (armbar)
| Upcoming Glory 7
| 
| align=center| 1
| align=center| 4:30
| Overijssel, Netherlands
| 
|-
| Win
| align=center| 4–1
| Alexandra Buch
| Submission (heel hook)
| MMA Berlin: Tournament 16
| 
| align=center| 1
| align=center| 1:59
| Berlin, Germany
| 
|-
| Win
| align=center| 3–1
| Dalia Grakulskyte
| Submission (rear-naked choke)
| Night of Pain 2nd
| 
| align=center| 1
| align=center| 1:26
| Darmstadt, Germany
| 
|-
| Win
| align=center| 2–1
| Tania Loureiro
| TKO (Punches)
| Hamburger Kafig - First Strike
| 
| align=center| 1
| align=center| 0:30
| Hamburg, Germany
| 
|-
| Win
| align=center| 1–1
| Lydia Myska
| Submission (armbar)
| FCA: Fight Club Plauen
| 
| align=center| 1
| align=center| 0:30
| Plauen, Germany
| 
|-
| Loss
| align=center| 0–1
| Majanka Lathouwers
| Submission (rear-naked choke)
| UFR: Mix Fight Gala
| 
| align=center| 1
| align=center| N/A
| Neuwied, Germany
|

Mixed martial arts amateur record

| Win
| align=center| 3–0–1
| Julie Larsen
| Submission (armbar)
| FG: Fight Night 2
| 
| align=center| 1
| align=center| 1:04
| Odense, Denmark
| 
| 
|-
| Win
| align=center| 2–0–1
| Katharina Albinus
| TKO (punches)
| FFA: New Talents 8
| 
| align=center| 1
| align=center| 1:54
| Eschwege, Germany
| 
|-
| Draw
| align=center| 1–0–1
| Tania Loureiro
| Draw
| FFA: New Talents 6
| 
| align=center| 2
| align=center| 5:00
| Eschwege, Germany
| 
|-
| Win
| align=center| 1–0
| Annett Sonntag
| TKO (punches)
| FFA: New Talents 2
| 
| align=center| 1
| align=center| 1:20
| Eschwege, Germany
|

References

External links
 Sheila Gaff's official website 
 Sheila Gaff Awakening Profile
 
 
 

1989 births
Living people
People from Bad Hersfeld
Sportspeople from Kassel (region)
Bantamweight mixed martial artists
German female mixed martial artists
Flyweight mixed martial artists
Featherweight mixed martial artists
Strawweight mixed martial artists
Ultimate Fighting Championship female fighters